Poly(A) polymerase alpha is an enzyme that in humans is encoded by the PAPOLA gene.

PAPOLA binds to FIP1L1 (Factor interacting with PAPOLA and CPSF1), a subunit of the cleavage and polyadenylation specificity factor subunit 1 (CPSF1) complex. This complex polyadenylates the 3' end of precursor mRNAs (pre-mRNA) (see CPSF). CPSF1 is an RNA processing protein that binds to uracil-rich sequences in pre-mRNA, binds with and stimulates POPOLA's Polynucleotide adenylyltransferase activity, and thereby adds adenylyl residues to pre-mRNA. This poly-adenylyl action increases pre mRNA's maturation and movement from the nucleus to cytoplasm while dramatically increasing the stability of the mRNA formed from pre-mRNA: FIP1L1 is a Pre-mRNA 3'-end-processing factor. FIP1L1 gene fusions between it and either the platelet-derived growth factor receptor, alpha (PGDFRA) or Retinoic acid receptor alpha (RARA) genes are causes of certain human diseases associated with pathologically increased levels of blood eosinophils and/or Leukemias.

References

Further reading